Kadenbach is an Ortsgemeinde – a community belonging to a Verbandsgemeinde – in the Westerwaldkreis in Rhineland-Palatinate, Germany.

Geography

The community lies in the Westerwald between Montabaur and Koblenz in the Nassau Nature Park. The community belongs to the Verbandsgemeinde of Montabaur, a kind of collective municipality.

History
In 1110, Kadenbach had its first documentary mention.

Politics

Community council
The council is made up of 17 council members, including the extraofficial mayor (Bürgermeister), who were elected in a municipal election on 13 June 2004.

Coat of arms
The community's arms recalls, with the cross pattée resembling the Teutonic Knights’ cross and the black eagle's head as part of the whole, the community's almost 600-year allegiance to the Koblenz House of the Teutonic Knights. The red cross and the tincture silver stand for the overlordship of the Electorate of Trier.

Economy and infrastructure
In 2006, a new credit union was built.

Transport
The nearest Autobahn interchange is Montabaur on the A 3 (Cologne–Frankfurt), some 12 km away.

References

External links
Kadenbach 

Municipalities in Rhineland-Palatinate
Westerwaldkreis